Perittia biloba is a moth of the family Elachistidae. It is found in Tajikistan, Kazakhstan and Uzbekistan.

The length of the forewings is about 3 mm. The ground colour of the forewings is white, strongly mottled with brown tipped scales. The hindwings are brownish. Adults have been recorded in June.

References

Moths described in 1990
Elachistidae
Moths of Asia